Abraham Lincoln: Vampire Hunter is a 2012 American action horror film directed by Timur Bekmambetov and based on the novel of the same name by Seth Grahame-Smith, depicting a fictionalized history of the American Civil War with the eponymous 16th president of the United States reimagined as having a secret identity as a lifelong vampire hunter fighting against a caste of vampiric slave owners. Benjamin Walker stars as Abraham Lincoln with supporting roles by Dominic Cooper, Anthony Mackie, Mary Elizabeth Winstead, Rufus Sewell, and Marton Csokas.

The film was produced by Tim Burton, Bekmambetov, and Jim Lemley, with Simon Kinberg as an executive producer. Filming began in Louisiana in March 2011 and the film was released in Real D 3D on June 20, 2012 in the United Kingdom and June 22, 2012 in the United States. The film received mixed reviews, with critics praising the visual style, action sequences, originality, Walker's performance and Henry Jackman's musical score, but criticism was aimed at its screenplay, the overly serious and inconsistent tone, overuse of CGI, and pacing. The film also failed to meet expectations at the box office, grossing $116 million worldwide against the budget of $69-$99 million.

Plot

In 1818, Abraham Lincoln lives in Indiana with parents Nancy, and Thomas who works at a plantation owned by Jack Barts. There, Abraham befriends a young African-American boy, William Johnson, and intervenes when he sees Johnson being beaten by a slaver. Because of his son's actions, Thomas is fired. That night, Abraham sees Barts break into his house and attack Nancy. She falls ill, dying the next day. Thomas tells Abraham that Barts poisoned Nancy.

Nine years later, Abraham decides to get revenge. He shoots Barts at the docks, but Barts, who is actually a vampire, overpowers him. However, before Barts can kill him, Lincoln is rescued by Henry Sturgess, who had earlier met him as a gun fell out of Lincoln's pocket. Sturgess explains that vampires exist, and offers to teach Lincoln to be a vampire hunter. Lincoln accepts and, after a decade of training, travels to Springfield, Illinois. Sturgess tells Lincoln that the vampires in America descend from Adam, a powerful vampire who owns a plantation in New Orleans with his sister, Vadoma. Sturgess also tells Lincoln of the vampires' weakness, silver, and presents him with a silver pocket watch.

In Springfield, Lincoln befriends shopkeeper Joshua Speed, and meets Mary Todd. Though Sturgess warned him not to form close relationships, Lincoln develops romantic feelings for Mary. While in Springfield, Lincoln hunts vampires named in letters by Sturgess.

Lincoln successfully finds and defeats Barts. Before dying, Barts reveals that Sturgess is also a vampire. Lincoln confronts Sturgess, who reveals that, several years ago, he was bitten by Adam. Because Sturgess' soul was impure, he became a vampire, and that prevented him from harming Adam or other vampires (since "Only the living can kill the dead"). Sturgess has since been training vampire hunters, hoping to destroy Adam.

Disappointed, Lincoln decides to abandon his mission. However, Adam learns of his activities and kidnaps Johnson to lure Lincoln into a trap at his plantation. Adam captures Lincoln and tries to recruit him, revealing his plans to turn America into a nation of the undead. Speed rescues his friends, and they escape to Ohio.

Lincoln marries Mary Todd and begins his political career, campaigning to abolish slavery. Sturgess warns Lincoln that the slave trade keeps vampires under control, as vampires use slaves for food, and if Lincoln interferes, the vampires will retaliate. After Lincoln's election as President of the United States of America, he moves to the White House with Mary, where they have a son, William Wallace Lincoln.  William is later bitten by Vadoma and dies.

Confederate President Jefferson Davis convinces Adam to deploy his vampires on the front lines. Lincoln orders the confiscation of all the silverware in the area and has it melted to produce silver weapons. Speed, supposedly believing that Lincoln is tearing the nation apart, defects and informs Adam that Lincoln will transport the silver by train.

On the train, Adam and Vadoma, who have set fire to an upcoming trestle, attack Lincoln, Sturgess, and Johnson. During the fight, in which Speed is killed, Adam learns that the train holds only rocks. Lincoln reveals that Speed's betrayal was a ruse to lure Adam into a trap. Lincoln uses his watch to punch Adam, killing him, and the three escape the train before the burning trestle beneath it collapses. Meanwhile, Mary and the ex-slaves have transported the silver to Gettysburg through the Underground Railroad.

The now-leaderless Confederate vampires stage a final, massive assault and are met head-on by the Union. Armed with their silver weapons, the Union soldiers destroy the vampires and eventually win the war. Before the battle, Mary recognizes Vadoma and avenges her son by shooting Vadoma in the head with a silver necklace bearing the sword of one of William's toy soldiers.

Nearly two years later, on April 14, 1865, Sturgess tells Lincoln that the remaining vampires have fled the country. Sturgess tries to convince Lincoln to allow him to turn Lincoln into a vampire, so he can become immortal and keep fighting vampires, but Lincoln declines.

In modern times, Sturgess approaches a man at a bar in Washington, D.C., just as he once did Abraham. Upon slapping his back, a gun falls to the floor.

Cast

 Benjamin Walker as Abraham Lincoln, a secret vampire hunter, who serves as the 16th President of the United States.
 Lux Haney-Jardine as Young Abraham Lincoln
 Dominic Cooper as Henry Sturgess, Lincoln's mentor in vampire hunting, a former vampire hunter, and a vampire who lost his wife and humanity to vampires.
 Anthony Mackie as Will Johnson, Lincoln's earliest and closest friend.
 Curtis Harris as Young Will
 Mary Elizabeth Winstead as Mary Todd Lincoln, Lincoln's wife.
 Rufus Sewell as Adam, the 5,000-year-old leader of an order of vampires.
 Marton Csokas as Jack Barts, a plantation owner and the vampire who killed Lincoln's mother.
 Jimmi Simpson as Joshua Speed, Lincoln's friend and assistant.
 Joseph Mawle as Thomas Lincoln, Lincoln's father.
 Robin McLeavy as Nancy Lincoln, Lincoln's mother.
 Erin Wasson as Vadoma, Adam's sister.
 John Rothman as Jefferson Davis
 Cameron M. Brown as William Wallace Lincoln, Abraham and Mary's third son.
 Frank Brennan as Senator Jeb Nolan
 Jaqueline Fleming as Harriet Tubman
 Alan Tudyk as Stephen A. Douglas, an American politician from Illinois.

Production
The film Abraham Lincoln: Vampire Hunter was first announced in March 2010 when Tim Burton and Bekmambetov paired to purchase film rights and to finance its development themselves. The book's author, Seth Grahame-Smith, was hired to write the script. Fox beat other studios in a bidding war for rights to the film the following October.

In January 2011, with Bekmambetov attached as director, Walker was cast as Abraham Lincoln. He beat Adrien Brody, Josh Lucas, James D'Arcy, and Oliver Jackson-Cohen for the role. Additional actors were cast in the following February. Filming began in March 2011 in Louisiana. The film had a budget of $99.5 million and was produced in 3D.

Release
The movie premiered in New York City on June 18. Abraham Lincoln: Vampire Hunter also made an unconventional debut with a screening for troops deployed in the Middle East. The movie was screened to over 1,800 sailors aboard the Navy aircraft carrier USS Abraham Lincoln, just before its Refueling and Complex Overhaul (RCOH) at Newport News, Virginia. Several of the film's stars attended the screening, including Anthony Mackie, Erin Wasson and Benjamin Walker, who dressed in character as Abraham Lincoln. The screening marks the first time that a major motion picture made its debut for United States servicemembers.

Reception
As of November 9, 2014, Rotten Tomatoes reports a "rotten" approval score of 34%, based on 190 reviews, with an average score of 4.9/10. The consensus reads that the film "has visual style to spare, but its overly serious tone doesn't jibe with its decidedly silly central premise, leaving filmgoers with an unfulfilling blend of clashing ingredients." Emanuel Levy of EmanuelLevy.com wrote that "Though original, this is a strenuous effort to combine the conventions of two genres." The movie also garnered a "mixed or average" score of 42 out of 100 on Metacritic, based on 35 reviews.

Richard Corliss of Time magazine stated that "The historical epic and the monster movie run on parallel tracks, occasionally colliding but never forming a coherent whole." Christy Lemire of Associated Press meanwhile, commented on the film's tenor and visual effects, saying "What ideally might have been playful and knowing is instead uptight and dreary, with a visual scheme that's so fake and cartoony, it depletes the film of any sense of danger," awarding the film a rating of 1.5 out of 4. Joe Morgenstern of The Wall Street Journal agreed, writing, "Someone forgot to tell the filmmakers ... that the movie was supposed to be fun. Or at least smart."

Joe Neumaler of New York Daily News gave the film a rating of 1 out of 5, writing, "This insipid mashup of history lesson and monster flick takes itself semi-seriously, which is truly deadly." The title was praised by Manohla Dargis of The New York Times, who added, "it's too bad someone had to spoil things by making a movie to go with it."

Positive response, meanwhile, came from Marc Savlov of the Austin Chronicle, "Abraham Lincoln: Vampire Hunter has heart to spare, and the occasional silvered bayonet to run it through." USA Today reviewer Scott Bowles remarked, "A stylish slasher of a movie, a monster flick that does its vampires right, if not their real-life counterparts," giving the film 2.5 out of 4. Further acclaim came from Joe Williams of St. Louis Post-Dispatch, who called it "the best action movie of the summer," praised the film for presenting "a surprisingly respectful tone toward American values and their most heroic proponent", calling "the battlefield scenes [...] suitably epic" and commended leading star Benjamin Walker, "a towering actor who looks like a young Liam Neeson and never stoops to caricature."

Box office
Abraham Lincoln: Vampire Hunter grossed $37,519,139 at the domestic box office and $78,952,441 in international markets. It received a worldwide total of $116,471,580. On its opening domestic weekend, it grossed $16.3 million from 3,108 theaters. In its second domestic weekend, it suffered a 63.1% drop, while gaining one theater. On its third weekend, it lost nearly half of its theater count, and another 67.6% in gross.

Home media
Abraham Lincoln: Vampire Hunter was released on DVD, Blu-ray and Blu-ray 3D in the United States and Canada on October 23, 2012.

Accolades

Soundtrack
The soundtrack to Abraham Lincoln: Vampire Hunter as composed by Henry Jackman was released digitally on June 12, 2012 and set to be released physically on July 3, 2012. In addition, Linkin Park's song "Powerless", from their 2012 album Living Things premiered in the official trailer to Abraham Lincoln and was the first song to be played over the closing credits, followed by "The Rampant Hunter". However, the song was not featured in the soundtrack, but still the song was released as a single under the name of soundtrack in Japan.

See also
 Cultural depictions of Abraham Lincoln
 Abraham Lincoln vs. Zombies, a mockbuster of this film
 Hansel & Gretel: Witch Hunters, a film with a very similar theme – and its mockbuster Hansel & Gretel
 Jesus Christ Vampire Hunter, a cult film about Jesus Christ's life as a vampire hunter
 Queen Victoria: Demon Hunter
 The Amazing Screw-On Head,  a comic book and cartoon involving Abraham Lincoln and vampires
 Lincoln, a historical biographical film released in the same year about Abraham Lincoln
 Vampire film

Notes

References

External links

 
 
 
 
 

2010s action horror films
2010s English-language films
2012 3D films
2012 fantasy films
2012 films
2012 horror films
20th Century Fox films
American 3D films
American action horror films
2010s monster movies
American alternate history films
American Civil War alternate histories
American Civil War films
American films about revenge
American historical horror films
American vampire films
Dune Entertainment films
Fictional depictions of Abraham Lincoln in film
Fictional vampire hunters
Films based on American novels
Films based on horror novels
Films about Abraham Lincoln
Films based on works by Seth Grahame-Smith
Films directed by Timur Bekmambetov
Films produced by Tim Burton
Films scored by Henry Jackman
Films set in the 1810s
Films set in the 1820s
Films set in the 1830s
Films set in the 1840s
Films set in the 1850s
Films set in the 1860s
Films set in Illinois
Films set in Indiana
Films set in New Orleans
Films set in Pennsylvania
Films set in South Carolina
Films set in the White House
Films shot in Louisiana
Horror war films
Supernatural war films
Bazelevs Company films
2010s American films